LPAC is a Super PAC founded in 2012 to represent the interests of lesbians in the United States, and to campaign on LGBT and women's rights issues. According to its chair it was the first Super PAC of its kind. Its supporters include Billie Jean King, Jane Lynch, Laura Ricketts and Urvashi Vaid. On its first day of operations, LPAC raised $200,000.
In 2021, Mary Trump joined LPAC's board.

See also
Lesbian American history
War on Women

References

External links
Official website

United States political action committees
LGBT political advocacy groups in the United States
Women's political advocacy groups in the United States
Lesbian organizations in the United States